Rosario de Mora is a municipality in the San Salvador department of El Salvador.  According to the Census of Population and Housing 2007, has 11,377 inhabitants.

History

In the 1807  "The Rosary" was a farm located within the town limits of Panchimalco, years later it became Canton Township. On April, 7 1894 it was renamed as Rosario de Mora.

Municipalities of the San Salvador Department